Beaufortia elegans, commonly known as elegant beaufortia, is a species of flowering plant in the myrtle family, Myrtaceae and is endemic to the southwest of Western Australia. It is an erect, diffuse shrub with crowded, curved leaves and heads of flowers that are usually reddish purple, although other colours also occur.

Description

The flowers are usually red to dark purplish red but other colours and white flowers are sometimes seen. The flowers have 5 sepals, 5 petals and 5 bundles of stamens. Flowering occurs from June to January but mostly from October to December and is followed by fruits which are woody, almost spherical capsules  in diameter.

Taxonomy and naming
Beaufortia elegans was first formally described in 1843 by Johannes Conrad Schauer in Dissertatio phytographica de Regelia, Beaufortia et Calothamno. The specific epithet (elegans) is a Latin word meaning "fine", "choice" or "tasteful".

Distribution and habitat
Beaufortia elegans mainly occurs between Perth and Geraldton in the Avon Wheatbelt, Geraldton Sandplains, Jarrah Forest and Swan Coastal Plain bioregions of south-western Western Australia. It usually grows in sand in kwongan vegetation often over laterite on plains and in areas that are wet in winter.

Conservation
Beaufortia elegans is classified as "not threatened" by the Western Australian Government Department of Biodiversity, Conservation and Attractions.

References

elegans
Plants described in 1843
Endemic flora of Western Australia
Taxa named by Johannes Conrad Schauer